In Hawaiian mythology, Nāmaka (or Nā-maka-o-Kahai, the eyes of Kahai) appears as a sea goddess in the Pele family. She is an older sister of Pele-honua-mea.

She is the daughter of Ku-waha-ilo and Haumea, whose other children are Pele, the Hiʻiaka sisters, the Kama brothers, and the bird Halulu. Aukelenuiaiku becomes Namaka's husband in Kahiki, but then later the husband of Pele, and because of this Pele, the Hiiaka sisters, Malulani, and Kaʻōhelo migrate to Hawaii. When Pele quarrels with her powerful sister  Namaka, Namaka sends tidal waves to destroy Pele's lands and homes. Helped by her family, Pele fights Namaka, but Namaka defeats her.

In Thrum's Kane-huna-moku myth Nāmaka is called the chiefess of the Mu and Menehune people when they are summoned to build the watercourse for Kikiaola at Waimea on Kauai (Beckwith 1970:193, 495).

When Pele causes a conflagration by staying too close to the fire god Lono-makua, Nāmaka drives her away (Beckwith 1970:170). Another legend mentions that Nāmaka's guardian dog, Moela is reduced to ashes when he touches Aukele (Beckwith 1970:348).

Moon
Namaka, the smaller moon of the dwarf planet Haumea, is named after the goddess.

Notes

References

 M. Beckwith, Hawaiian Mythology (University of Hawaii Press: Honolulu) 1970.

Hawaiian mythology

Hawaiian goddesses
Sea and river goddesses
Water spirits